The 1997–98 NBA season was the Hawks' 49th season in the National Basketball Association, and 30th season in Atlanta. Due to the demolition of The Omni during the off-season, the Hawks played their home games between the Georgia Dome, home of the NFL's Atlanta Falcons, and the Alexander Memorial Coliseum, home of the NCAA's Georgia Tech Yellow Jackets basketball team. The Alexander Memorial Coliseum (known as "Alexander Memorial Coliseum at McDonald's Center" at the time) was also the Hawks' original home from 1968 to 1972. In the off-season, the team signed free agent Chucky Brown, and re-signed Greg Anderson, who previously played for the Hawks during the 1994–95 season. The Hawks got off to a fast start winning their first eleven games of the season. However, after a 19–5 start, they would struggle losing seven straight games between December and January, but then won six straight afterwards and held a 29–20 record at the All-Star break. The Hawks won eight of their final eleven games, finishing fourth in the Central Division with a solid 50–32 record.

Dikembe Mutombo averaged 13.4 points, 11.4 rebounds and 3.4 blocks per game, and was named Defensive Player of the Year for the second straight year, and was also named to the All-NBA Third Team, and NBA All-Defensive First Team, while Steve Smith led the Hawks in scoring averaging 20.1 points per game for the second straight season. Mutombo and Smith were both selected for the 1998 NBA All-Star Game. In addition, Alan Henderson averaged 14.3 points and 6.4 rebounds per game, after replacing Christian Laettner as the team's starting power forward at midseason, and was named Most Improved Player of the Year, while Laettner provided the team with 13.8 points and 6.6 rebounds per game, and Mookie Blaylock contributed 13.2 points, 6.7 assists, led the league with 2.6 steals per game, and was named to the NBA All-Defensive Second Team. Tyrone Corbin provided with 10.2 points and 1.3 steals per game, and Eldridge Recasner contributed 9.3 points per game off the bench. Blaylock also finished tied in fifth place in Defensive Player of the Year voting.

However, in the playoffs, the Hawks lost in four games to the Charlotte Hornets in the Eastern Conference First Round, despite a 32-point margin in a Game 3 home win over the Hornets, 96–64. Following the season, Laettner was traded to the Detroit Pistons, while Recasner and Brown both signed as free agents with the Charlotte Hornets, and Anderson was released to free agency.

On March 27, 1998, the Hawks set a single game regular season attendance record of 62,046 fans at the Georgia Dome in a game against Michael Jordan, and the 2-time defending champion Chicago Bulls, who defeated the Hawks, 89–74. The Bulls would go on to defeat the Utah Jazz in six games in the NBA Finals for their third consecutive championship, and sixth overall in eight years.

Offseason

Draft picks

Roster

Roster Notes
 Rookie shooting guard Ed Gray was suspended indefinitely after playing 30 games for missing medical appointments. Gray was on the injured reserve list with a sprained right foot.

Regular season

Season standings

z – clinched division title
y – clinched division title
x – clinched playoff spot

Record vs. opponents

Game log

|- align="center" bgcolor="ccffcc"
|| 1 || October 31 || @ Orlando Magic || W 105–99 || Orlando Arena || 1–0
|-

|- align="center" bgcolor="ccffcc"
|| 2 || November 1 || Toronto Raptors || W 90–85 || Alexander Memorial Coliseum || 2–0
|- align="center" bgcolor="ccffcc"
|| 3 || November 4 || Detroit Pistons || W 82–71 || Georgia Dome || 3–0
|- align="center" bgcolor="ccffcc"
|| 4 || November 5 || @ Philadelphia 76ers || W 93–88|| CoreStates Center || 4–0
|- align="center" bgcolor="ccffcc"
|| 5 || November 7 || Chicago Bulls || W 80–78 || Georgia Dome || 5–0
|- align="center" bgcolor="ccffcc"
|| 6 || November 8 || @ Cleveland Cavaliers || W 99–97 (OT) || Gund Arena || 6–0
|- align="center" bgcolor="ccffcc"
|| 7 || November 11 || Seattle SuperSonics || W 89–87 || Georgia Dome || 7–0
|- align="center" bgcolor="ccffcc"
|| 8 || November 12 || @ Indiana Pacers || W 89–86 || Market Square Arena || 8–0
|- align="center" bgcolor="ccffcc"
|| 9 || November 14 || Sacramento Kings || W 104–103 || Georgia Dome || 9–0
|- align="center" bgcolor="ccffcc"
|| 10 || November 16 || Los Angeles Clippers || W 89–83 || Alexander Memorial Coliseum || 10–0
|- align="center" bgcolor="ccffcc"
|| 11 || November 18 || Washington Wizards || W 98–89 (OT) || Georgia Dome || 11–0
|- align="center" bgcolor="ffcccc"
|| 12 || November 20 || New York Knicks || L 79–100 || Georgia Dome || 11–1
|- align="center" bgcolor="ffcccc"
|| 13 || November 22 || @ Detroit Pistons || L 85–87 || The Palace of Auburn Hills || 11–2
|- align="center" bgcolor="ccffcc"
|| 14 || November 26 || @ Toronto Raptors || W 109–104 (2OT) || SkyDome || 12–2
|- align="center" bgcolor="ccffcc"
|| 15 || November 29 || Charlotte Hornets || W 98–80 || Georgia Dome || 13–2
|- align="center" bgcolor="ccffcc"
|| 16 || November 30 || San Antonio Spurs || W 108–96 || Georgia Dome || 14–2
|-

|- align="center" bgcolor="ccffcc"
|| 17 || December 2 || @ Dallas Mavericks || W 112–79 || Reunion Arena || 15–2
|- align="center" bgcolor="ffcccc"
|| 18 || December 4 || @ Houston Rockets || L 87–94 || The Summit || 15–3
|- align="center" bgcolor="ffcccc"
|| 19 || December 9 || Miami Heat || L 81–97 || Alexander Memorial Coliseum || 15–4
|- align="center" bgcolor="ffcccc"
|| 20 || December 11 || @ Phoenix Suns || L 78–94 || America West Arena || 15–5
|- align="center" bgcolor="ccffcc"
|| 21 || December 12 || @ Los Angeles Clippers || W 83–74 || Los Angeles Memorial Sports Arena || 16–5
|- align="center" bgcolor="ccffcc"
|| 22 || December 14 || @ Sacramento Kings || W 93–89 || ARCO Arena || 17–5
|- align="center" bgcolor="ccffcc"
|| 23 || December 15 || @ Portland Trail Blazers || W 99–90 || Rose Garden || 18–5
|- align="center" bgcolor="ccffcc"
|| 24 || December 17 || Cleveland Cavaliers || W 94–83 || Georgia Dome || 19–5
|- align="center" bgcolor="ffcccc"
|| 25 || December 19 || Los Angeles Lakers || L 96–98 || Georgia Dome || 19–6
|- align="center" bgcolor="ffcccc"
|| 26 || December 20 || @ Miami Heat || L 92–99 || Miami Arena || 19–7
|- align="center" bgcolor="ffcccc"
|| 27 || December 22 || Utah Jazz || L 99–101 || Georgia Dome || 19–8
|- align="center" bgcolor="ffcccc"
|| 28 || December 26 || @ Milwaukee Bucks || L 94–99 (OT) || Bradley Center || 19–9
|- align="center" bgcolor="ffcccc"
|| 29 || December 27 || @ Chicago Bulls || L 90–97 || United Center || 19–10
|-

|- align="center" bgcolor="ffcccc"
|| 30 || January 2 || @ Los Angeles Lakers || L 106–116 || Great Western Forum || 19–11
|- align="center" bgcolor="ffcccc"
|| 31 || January 3 || @ Utah Jazz || L 82–97 || Delta Center ||
19–12
|- align="center" bgcolor="ccffcc"
|| 32 || January 7 || @ Golden State Warriors || W 106–86 || Oakland Arena || 20–12
|- align="center" bgcolor="ccffcc"
|| 33 || January 9 || Washington Wizards || W 82–77 || Alexander Memorial Coliseum || 21–12
|- align="center" bgcolor="ccffcc"
|| 34 || January 11 || @ Washington Wizards || W 107–102 (OT) || MCI Center || 22–12
|- align="center" bgcolor="ccffcc"
|| 35 || January 13 || @ New York Knicks || W 91–89 || Madison Square Garden || 23–12
|- align="center" bgcolor="ccffcc"
|| 36 || January 14 || Dallas Mavericks || W 108–82 || Alexander Memorial Coliseum || 24–12
|- align="center" bgcolor="ccffcc"
|| 37 || January 16 || Golden State Warriors || W 102–89 || Alexander Memorial Coliseum || 25–12
|- align="center" bgcolor="ffcccc"
|| 38 || January 17 || @ New Jersey Nets || L 81–97 || Continental Airlines Arena || 25–13
|- align="center" bgcolor="ccffcc"
|| 39 || January 20 || Milwaukee Bucks || W 103–89 || Georgia Dome || 26–13
|- align="center" bgcolor="ffcccc"
|| 40 || January 21 || @ San Antonio Spurs || L 76–90 || Alamodome || 26–14
|- align="center" bgcolor="ffcccc"
|| 41 || January 23 || Boston Celtics || L 85–89 || Georgia Dome || 26–15
|- align="center" bgcolor="ffcccc"
|| 42 || January 24 || Portland Trail Blazers || L 77–92 || Georgia Dome || 26–16
|- align="center" bgcolor="ffcccc"
|| 43 || January 26 || Phoenix Suns || L 91–96 || Georgia Dome || 26–17
|- align="center" bgcolor="ffcccc"
|| 44 || January 27 || @ Minnesota Timberwolves || L 96–113 || Target Center || 26–18
|- align="center" bgcolor="ccffcc"
|| 45 || January 29 || Philadelphia 76ers || W 109–99 (OT) || Alexander Memorial Coliseum || 27–18
|- align="center" bgcolor="ccffcc"
|| 46 || January 31 || @ Charlotte Hornets || W 103–83 || Charlotte Coliseum || 28–18
|-

|- align="center" bgcolor="ffcccc"
|| 47 || February 2 || @ Miami Heat || L 83–90 || Miami Arena || 28–19
|- align="center" bgcolor="ffcccc"
|| 48 || February 3 || @ Orlando Magic || L 90–91 || Orlando Arena || 28–20
|- align="center" bgcolor="ccffcc"
|| 49 || February 5 || @ Cleveland Cavaliers || W 108–94 || Gund Arena || 29–20
|- align="center" bgcolor="ccffcc"
|| 50 || February 10 || @ Milwaukee Bucks || W 108–100 || Bradley Center || 30–20
|- align="center" bgcolor="ffcccc"
|| 51 || February 13 || @ Chicago Bulls || L 110–112 || United Center || 30–21
|- align="center" bgcolor="ffcccc"
|| 52 || February 14 || Indiana Pacers || L 92–96 || Georgia Dome || 30–22
|- align="center" bgcolor="ffcccc"
|| 53 || February 16 || Orlando Magic || L 81–85 || Georgia Dome || 30–23
|- align="center" bgcolor="ccffcc"
|| 54 || February 18 || New Jersey Nets || W 114–104 || Alexander Memorial Coliseum || 31–23
|- align="center" bgcolor="ccffcc"
|| 55 || February 20 || Vancouver Grizzlies || W 115–92 || Alexander Memorial Coliseum || 32–23
|- align="center" bgcolor="ccffcc"
|| 56 || February 25 || @ Denver Nuggets || W 112–88 || McNichols Arena || 33–23
|- align="center" bgcolor="ffcccc"
|| 57 || February 27 || @ Seattle SuperSonics || L 88–90|| KeyArena at Seattle Center || 33–24
|-

|- align="center" bgcolor="ccffcc"
|| 58 || March 1 || @ Vancouver Grizzlies || W 101–76 || General Motors Place || 34–24
|- align="center" bgcolor="ccffcc"
|| 59 || March 6 || Denver Nuggets || W 115–94 || Alexander Memorial Coliseum || 35–24
|- align="center" bgcolor="ccffcc"
|| 60 || March 8 || Cleveland Cavaliers || W 101–96 || Alexander Memorial Coliseum || 36–24
|- align="center" bgcolor="ccffcc"
|| 61 || March 11 || @ Boston Celtics || W 110–105 || FleetCenter || 37–24
|- align="center" bgcolor="ffcccc"
|| 62 || March 13 || @ Philadelphia 76ers || L 86–107|| CoreStates Center || 37–25
|- align="center" bgcolor="ccffcc"
|| 63 || March 15 || Boston Celtics || W 93–77 || Alexander Memorial Coliseum || 38–25
|- align="center" bgcolor="ccffcc"
|| 64 || March 17 || @ Toronto Raptors || W 117–105 || SkyDome || 39–25
|- align="center" bgcolor="ccffcc"
|| 65 || March 19 || Milwaukee Bucks || W 84–81 || Alexander Memorial Coliseum || 40–25
|- align="center" bgcolor="ffcccc"
|| 66 || March 20 || @ New York Knicks || L 108–109 || Madison Square Garden || 40–26
|- align="center" bgcolor="ffcccc"
|| 67 || March 22 || @ Detroit Pistons || L 98–105 || The Palace of Auburn Hills || 40–27
|- align="center" bgcolor="ccffcc"
|| 68 || March 24 || Orlando Magic || W 85–73 || Georgia Dome || 41–27
|- align="center" bgcolor="ffcccc"
|| 69 || March 27 || Chicago Bulls || L 74–89 || Georgia Dome || 41–28
|- align="center" bgcolor="ccffcc"
|| 70 || March 29 || Detroit Pistons || W 118–95 || Georgia Dome || 42–28
|- align="center" bgcolor="ffcccc"
|| 71 || March 31 || @ New Jersey Nets || W 90–105 || Continental Airlines Arena || 42–29
|-

|- align="center" bgcolor="ccffcc"
|| 72 || April 1 || Toronto Raptors || W 105–91 || Georgia Dome || 43–29
|- align="center" bgcolor="ccffcc"
|| 73 || April 3 || Houston Rockets || W 107–87 || Georgia Dome || 44–29
|- align="center" bgcolor="ffcccc"
|| 74 || April 5 || Minnesota Timberwolves || L 96–97 || Georgia Dome || 44–30
|- align="center" bgcolor="ccffcc"
|| 75 || April 7 || New York Knicks || W 92–79 || Georgia Dome || 45–30
|- align="center" bgcolor="ffcccc"
|| 76 || April 9 || Indiana Pacers || L 102–105 (OT) || Georgia Dome || 45–31
|- align="center" bgcolor="ccffcc"
|| 77 || April 10 || @ Charlotte Hornets || W 99–87 || Charlotte Coliseum || 46–31
|- align="center" bgcolor="ccffcc"
|| 78 || April 12 || @ Washington Wizards || W 91–81 || MCI Center || 47–31
|- align="center" bgcolor="ccffcc"
|| 79 || April 14 || Philadelphia 76ers || W 95–94 || Georgia Dome || 48–31
|- align="center" bgcolor="ffcccc"
|| 80 || April 15 || @ Indiana Pacers || L 70–82 || Market Square Arena || 48–32
|- align="center" bgcolor="ccffcc"
|| 81 || April 17 || Charlotte Hornets || W 121–104 || Georgia Dome || 49–32
|- align="center" bgcolor="ccffcc"
|| 82 || April 19 || Miami Heat || W 101–89 || Georgia Dome || 50–32
|-

Playoffs

|- align="center" bgcolor="#ffcccc"
| 1
| April 23
| @ Charlotte
| L 87–97
| Steve Smith (35)
| Dikembe Mutombo (15)
| Mookie Blaylock (9)
| Charlotte Coliseum19,176
| 0–1
|- align="center" bgcolor="#ffcccc"
| 2
| April 25
| @ Charlotte
| L 85–92
| Henderson, Smith (22)
| Henderson, Mutombo (9)
| Mookie Blaylock (13)
| Charlotte Coliseum20,390
| 0–2
|- align="center" bgcolor="#ccffcc"
| 3
| April 28
| Charlotte
| W 96–64
| Mookie Blaylock (16)
| Dikembe Mutombo (11)
| Mookie Blaylock (7)
| Georgia Dome19,745
| 1–2
|- align="center" bgcolor="#ffcccc"
| 4
| May 1
| Charlotte
| L 82–91
| Steve Smith (27)
| Dikembe Mutombo (16)
| Mookie Blaylock (4)
| Georgia Dome22,074
| 1–3
|-

Player statistics

Season

Playoffs

Awards and records
 Dikembe Mutombo, NBA Defensive Player of the Year Award
 Alan Henderson, NBA Most Improved Player Award
 Dikembe Mutombo, All-NBA Third Team
 Dikembe Mutombo, NBA All-Defensive First Team
 Mookie Blaylock, NBA All-Defensive Second Team

Transactions

Trades
September 29, 1997
Traded Priest Lauderdale to the Denver Nuggets for Efthimios Rentzias and a 2000 second round draft pick.

Free agents
September 26, 1997
Signed Anthony Miller as a free agent.
Signed Donald Whiteside as a free agent.
Signed Drew Barry as a free agent.

October 2, 1997
Signed Chucky Brown as a free agent.
Signed Chris King as a free agent.

October 8, 1997
Waived Chris King.

October 10, 1997
Signed Greg Anderson as a free agent.

October 19, 1997
Waived Drew Barry

November 7, 1997
Signed Randy Livingston as a free agent.
Waived Donald Whiteside.

November 20, 1997
Waived Randy Livingston.

December 9, 1997
Signed Randy Livingston as a free agent.

January 10, 1998
Waived Randy Livingston.

January 20, 1998
Signed Drew Barry to a 10-day contract.

February 11, 1998
Signed Drew Barry to a contract for the rest of the season.

February 13, 1998
Signed Lloyd Daniels to a 10-day contract.

February 15, 1998
Released Lloyd Daniels.

February 17, 1998
Signed Brian Oliver to the first of two 10-day contracts.

Player Transactions Citation:

See also
 1997–98 NBA season

References

Atlanta Hawks seasons
Atlanta Haw
Atlanta Haw
Atlanta Hawks